Motihari is the headquarters of East Champaran district in the Indian state of Bihar.

Demographics
As of 2011 India census, Motihari had a population of 976 in 198 households. Males constitute 50.7% of the population and females 49.2%. Motihari has an average literacy rate of 49.5%, lower than the national average of 74%: male literacy is 62.9%, and female literacy is 37%. In Motihari, 20.9% of the population is under 6 years of age.
Motihari Is about 180 km from Patna, capital of Bihar.

References

Villages in West Champaran district